Conspiracy Theory with Jesse Ventura is an American television series hosted by Jesse Ventura and broadcast on truTV. It ran for three seasons from 2009 to 2012 and was canceled in 2013.

Format 
Former Navy Underwater Demolition Team (UDT), professional wrestler, actor and Governor of Minnesota Jesse Ventura examines various conspiracy theories on subjects such as global warming, the September 11 attacks, secret societies, government surveillance and secret weapons projects.

In the first season, Ventura teams up with a group of investigators consisting of skeptic Alex Piper, reporter June Sarpong and investigator Michael Braverman. In season two, Piper is replaced by investigator Daniel Kucan in a few episodes. In season three, Ventura's son, Tyrel Ventura, and Oliver Stone's son, Sean Stone, are part of the investigative team.

Ratings and reviews 
The premiere episode was watched by 1.635 million viewers, TruTV's biggest audience for a new series launch. The next two episodes were watched by 1.586 million and 1.301 million viewers. Over the first three episodes the series averaged 1.5 million viewers, up 60% from the same time slot a year before. During January the show averaged 1.6 million viewers, helping truTV deliver its biggest month ever in prime time.

Critics who have reviewed the show include Linda Stasi of New York Post, who called it "mindless, good fun and a hoot to watch aging action stars still taking action", and Robert Lloyd of the Los Angeles Times, who wrote, "Whatever truth is out there, it's filtered here through what is arranged more as an adventure series than a documentary."

Controversy

'Police State' criticism

An episode from season two titled "Police State" caused some controversy when it investigated allegations that various prison-like facilities built around the country that are operated by the Federal Emergency Management Agency (FEMA) will be used during martial law for the internment of citizens who are deemed a threat to national security. Officials have said the facilities are emergency FEMA camps for the housing of civilians displaced by natural disasters. U.S. Representative Steve Cohen from Tennessee, a co-sponsor of a bill which aimed to create temporary FEMA camps for the housing of people affected by hurricanes or earthquakes in his district, was interviewed for the show.

Shortly after the episode aired, Cohen called for the removal of this program from truTV's lineup. He called the episode an "outrageous distortion and an outright lie," as well as "dangerous and irresponsible." He said "when the media purposely distort the facts to create confusion and mislead people, they must be held accountable. Unless we actively debunk false and misleading reports, we risk leaving the public with a dangerously skewed vision of this country." Cohen said he was "shocked and appalled" that Time Warner would air a program "so full of inaccuracies and irresponsible distortions."
 
Another allegation brought up in the episode focused on a private facility outside Covington, Georgia, that was stockpiling thousands of plastic bins alleged to be used as coffins for mass burials.

In a response to the criticism, Misty Skedgell, a Turner spokesperson, described Conspiracy Theory as an "entertainment program that appears on an entertainment network."

Although most of the episodes of Conspiracy Theory have been rerun, the "Police State" episode has been shown only once, owing largely to the controversy surrounding the content of the episode.

Production issues
After two seasons of the show, the creation of future episodes was in doubt when, on January 25, 2011, the Drudge Report announced that Ventura had filed a lawsuit against the Department of Homeland Security and the Transportation Security Administration (TSA), for what he calls "warrant-less and suspicion-less scans and body searches." Ventura, who has a titanium hip replacement, claimed that he sets off metal detectors and is always pulled out of line for lengthy pat-downs. The day of the announcement, Alex Jones, a consultant and frequent guest, said on his show that he had witnessed a pat-down of Ventura at the Atlanta International Airport while filming for Conspiracy Theory, during which Ventura loudly protested that "America is turning into East Germany." Jones said Ventura, who flew two to three times a week for Conspiracy Theory, refuses to fly commercially again, a vow he reiterated after his lawsuit against the TSA was dismissed in November 2011.

In May 2013, Ventura confirmed that the show has been discontinued and there will be no fourth season.

Unshown "TSA" episode
In a November 2012 appearance on Alex Jones's Infowars conspiracy-theory radio show, Ventura claimed that he and his team filmed an episode contending that Transportation Security Administration full-body scanners are carcinogenic but that the episode did not air on the instructions of TruTV network executives. Ventura contended that persons unknown "influenced truTV to do that."

List of episodes

Season one (2009–10)

Season two (2010)

Season three (2012)

References

External links
 Conspiracy Theory with Jesse Ventura Website
 
 Jesse Ventura on Global Warming: A Secret Plot to Take Over the World? Chattahbox.com article

2009 American television series debuts
2000s American reality television series
2010s American reality television series
2012 American television series endings
TruTV original programming
Television series about conspiracy theories
Jesse Ventura